Champion is a 2019 Indian Tamil-language sports drama film written and directed by Suseenthiran. The film stars newcomers Vishwa and Mirnalini Ravi, Narain, Manoj Bharathiraja, and Stun Siva play pivotal roles. The music for the film is composed by Arrol Corelli while cinematography and editing is handled by Sujith Sarang and Thiyagu respectively. The film is produced by Raghavi under the production banner Kalanjiyam Cine Arts. Principal photography of the film commenced on 30 May 2018. The film had its theatrical release on 13 December 2019 and received mixed reviews.

Cast 
Vishwa as Jones 
Mirnalini Ravi as Sana
Narain as Santha 
Manoj Bharathiraja as Gold Star Gopi
Stun Siva as Dhanasekar
Vasuki as Jaya
Sowmika Pandiyan as Pavithra
Vinod Sagar as Rajiv Gandhi
B. H. Tarun Kumar as Bhai
Kutty

Production 
The film was announced to be made as a sports drama film mainly based on the sport of football by director Suseenthiran after his previous sports drama films including Vennila Kabadi Kuzhu (2009), Jeeva (2014) which turned out to be successful. The shooting of the film went on floors from 30 May 2018. Mirnalini Ravi was selected to make her lead film debut in the female lead role along with another newcomer Vishwa. The shooting of the film wrapped up in around 19 September 2019.

The first look poster of the film was unveiled by actor Vishal through his Twitter account on 29 January 2019 coinciding on the eve of emotional 10 years anniversary of director Suseenthiran's filming career since making his directorial debut through Vennila Kabadi Kuzhu which was released on the same day (29 January) in 2009.

Soundtrack 

The songs were composed by Arrol Corelli with one song by Vishwa.

Release 
The Times of India gave the film a rating of three out of five stars and wrote that "Champion is a redemption for Susienthiran whose last few films were so underwhelming that it felt like the director had become a spent creative force". On the contrary, The Hindu wrote that "Champion only champions the cause for Susienthiran to script better films".

References

External links 

 

2010s Tamil-language films
2019 films
2010s sports drama films
Indian sports drama films
Films directed by Suseenthiran
2019 drama films
Indian association football films